Pervomaysky is a rural locality (a village) in Vyaznikovsky District, Vladimir Oblast, Russia. The population was 413 as of 2010. There are 2 streets.

Geography 
The village is located 2 km west from Vyazniki.

References 

Rural localities in Vyaznikovsky District